The Willapa Hills Trail is a 56-mile (90 km) intercounty rail trail in the U.S. state of Washington that is part of the Willapa Hills State Park. Following an east–west route alongside State Route 6, the tract links Chehalis and South Bend, traveling through or near several small towns and parks along the way. Overseen by the Washington State Park System, local cities and towns often maintain areas of the trail within their jurisdictions. The trail is built upon a decommissioned railroad track.

Route

The Willapa Hills Trail stretches from its eastern terminus at Chehalis, between Lintott-Alexander Park and Stan Hedwall Park, to the western end near downtown South Bend, Washington. The trail starts to accompany U.S. Route 101 in Raymond. The trail bridges the Newaukum River near the Chehalis trailhead, and over the Chehalis River five times in Lewis County. The path crosses several creeks in Pacific County, and twice over the Willapa River. The route passes by the ghost town of Walville. A spur traverses through Rainbow Falls State Park near Dryad and users can stop at Willie Keil's Grave State Park Heritage Site, north of Menlo.

Mostly complete within Lewis County, with a mix of pavement and compact gravel, the trail is only completed between Raymond and South Bend in Pacific County with large tracts in the county considered unimproved, though useable with caution. The trail is under the maintenance auspices of the Washington State Park System and is open for non-motorized activities year round to hikers, bicyclists, and horse riding.

Cities, towns, and communities

The trail intersects or passes near the following locations, from east to west:

Lewis County  

 Claquato
 Adna
 Millburn
 Ruth
 Ceres
 Meskill
 Dryad
 Doty
 Pe Ell
 McCormick

Pacific County

 Frances
 Lebam
 Holcomb
 Menlo
 Raymond

History

The trail, known locally at first as "Rails to Trails", was built over a decommissioned railroad line originally constructed by Northern Pacific Railway in 1892. The rail line, considered a spur, was used for both freight and passenger service. Passenger trains were cancelled in 1954 but use of the line for commercial purposes continued until 1990 when it would be designated as abandoned by the owner at the time, Burlington Northern Railroad. The Washington State Parks and Recreation agency acquired the entire  stretch in 1993. Volunteer efforts and local fundraising led to minor improvements to the new trail until 2007, when the first large-scale effort was begun.  With a combined $1.4 million in funding from various federal and state agencies, specific attention was given to a 5-mile (8.0 km) stretch between Chehalis and Adna for paving, various surfacing of the rail bed, restoring trestles, and improving trailheads. Due to damage from floods during the Great Coastal Gale of 2007, several bridges and trestles were repaired. The last phase of improvements in Lewis County was refurbishing a 4-mile (6.4 km) section from Pe Ell west to the county line.  Completed in 2018, the $600,000 project was funded by charitable donations and grants from various state government agencies. Construction of a $3.3 million pedestrian bridge over Washington State Route 6, less than one mile west of Claquato, was begun in 2021 that would lessen vehicular dangers for users of the trail.

The non-profit Lewis County Community Trail Association has hosted, since 2016, an annual, two-day "Ride the Willapa" bike event in early summer to raise funds to maintain and complete the trail. With the trail coursing through farmland, the charity ride often incorporates a farm tour. Before 2016, a similar yearly event was held under the name "Fat Tire Ride".

See also
 Chehalis Parks and Recreation

References

External links
 Lewis County Community Trails

Rail trails in Washington (state)